1961 – Toshiko Akiyoshi is a compilation (effectively a combined re-issue of 2 albums) of previous Toshiko Akiyoshi recordings from 1961.  All 5 tracks from the Asahi Sonorama releases, Long Yellow Road (also released as Tosiko Akiyosi Recital) as well as all 6 tracks from the King Records release Toshiko Meets Her Old Pals are contained on this album.  All of these tracks, along with those of many other artists, are also included on the 12-CD box set, A History of King Jazz Recordings.

Track listing

"Long Yellow Road" (Akiyoshi) – 5:39 
"Hakone Twilight" (Akiyoshi) – 5:35 
"Kisarazu Jinku"  (traditional) – 5:49
"Solveig's Song" (Grieg) – 5:53 
"Deep River" (traditional) – 5:12 
"So What" (Davis) – 10:48 
"The Night Has a Thousand Eyes" (Brainin) – 5:00 
"Donna Lee" (Parker) – 5:50 
"Quebec" (Mariano) – 6:19 
"Old Pals" (Akiyoshi) – 5:02 
"Watasu No Biethovin" (Akiyoshi) – 7:08

Personnel
Tracks 1~5: 
Toshiko Akiyoshi – piano
Eddie Marshall – drums 
Gene Cherico – bass 
Tracks 6~11: 
Toshiko Akiyoshi – piano 
Sadao Watanabe – alto saxophone
Akira Miyazawa – tenor saxophone 
Masanaga Harada – bass (tracks 6, 7, 10, 11) 
Hachiro Kurita – bass (tracks 8, 9)
Masahiko Togashi – drums (tracks 6, 7)
Hideo Shiraki – drums (tracks 8, 9)
Takeshi Inomata – drums (tracks 10, 11)

References / external links
KICJ 195 1961: Toshiko Akiyoshi, King Records (Japan) 8247 
KICJ 9031-9042 A History of King Jazz Recordings 12-CD box set.
[ Allmusic]

2001 compilation albums
Toshiko Akiyoshi compilation albums
King Records (Japan) compilation albums
Instrumental compilation albums